This is a sortable list of companies listed on the Mongolian Stock Exchange, including their English and Mongolian names, stock codes, and industries, as reflected on the exchange's official website. The list does not currently include information about companies which were delisted prior to 12 September 2007.

The Mongolian Stock Exchange, based in Ulan Bator, Mongolia, is the world's smallest stock exchange by market capitalisation. Its listed companies market capitalization was around US$1 billion in 2010 for 336 listed companies. Number of companies is continuing to decline. It is viewed that due to inadequate policy pursued by the Securities Commission being public become an additional burden for many of the public companies which led to mass delisting during the last decade. As of the end of 2014 some 237 companies are listed at the Mongolian Stock Exchange (MSE).

On the other hand, one of the key constraints for developing adequate stock market in Mongolia is lack of individuals’ savings from one side. Weak regulatory and legal environment seems like discouraging potential investors to invest into financial instruments currently being offered on the market.

List

References

Stock Exchange
Mongolia
Stock exchanges in Mongolia